The Union Attorney General is the Government of Myanmar's chief legal advisor, and also appears on behalf of the Burmese government in civil and criminal cases. The current Attorney General is Thida Oo who is also serves as Union Minister for Legal Affairs.

History
The Office of the Attorney General was established in 1948 under the 1947 Constitution of Myanmar and 1948 Attorney General of the Union Act. From 1974 through 1988, the post was called the Chairman of the Council of People's Attorney. The present law, the 2010 Attorney General of the Union Law was promulgated on 28 October 2010. The Union Attorney General is appointed by the President of Myanmar. The Union Attorney General leads the Office of the Union Attorney General in Naypyidaw. After the Provisional Government was formed in 2021, the Union Attorney General's Office was reorganized into a ministry on 30 August 2021 and Attorney General also serves as union minister of Legal Affairs.

List of attorneys general of Myanmar

See also
Cabinet of Myanmar
Office of the Attorney General (Myanmar)
Ministry of Legal Affairs (Myanmar)

References

External links
Official website

Government of Myanmar
Myanmar
Judiciary of Myanmar